The McDonnell 119/220 is a business jet developed and unsuccessfully marketed by McDonnell Aircraft in the late 1950s and early 1960s. Its configuration is unique for this type of aircraft, with four podded engines underneath a low wing. It is the only airplane built by McDonnell Aircraft to be marketed to civil buyers prior to the company's merger with Douglas Aircraft to form McDonnell Douglas. The jet could be outfitted for 10 passengers in a luxury executive configuration and could carry as many as 29.

Design and development
The Model 119 was designed in 1957 for the U.S. Air Force's UCX (Utility-Cargo Experimental) contract announced in August 1956, competing with the Lockheed JetStar. McDonnell entered the UCX competition with an eye on commercial sales; the company had never produced a civil aircraft.

Designed for a  range at  airspeed against a  headwind, the 119 had a wing sweep of 35 degrees and a vertical stabilizer sweep of 45 degrees. Roll control was provided by conventional ailerons, a combination of split flaps and Fowler flaps were used to enhance low-speed control, and the wings were equipped with spoilers that doubled as speed brakes. The cabin floor had tracks to allow interior fitments to be changed quickly to suit different missions; the aircraft could be used for medical evacuation, with room for 12 stretchers and two attendants, and McDonnell also promoted it as a trainer for bombardiers, flight navigators, radar operators, or electronic countermeasure technicians. Having invested over $10 million in company funds in the program, McDonnell initiated the formation of commercial sales and transport divisions to promote the 119, but company founder James Smith McDonnell was unwilling to commit to full-scale production until sizable orders were received.

Completion of the prototype was delayed until 1959 due to the cancellation of the intended Fairchild J83 engine. Fitted with Westinghouse J34 turbojets for flight test purposes, the 119 was first flown on 11 February 1959, but the Air Force rejected it later that year in favor of the Lockheed JetStar (designated C-140), citing concerns about foreign object damage with the 119's low-mounted engines. Following this setback, McDonnell continued to market the type commercially, renaming it the 220 to commemorate McDonnell's second 20 years of business, and showing it in a 10-place luxury configuration and a more basic configuration with 29 passenger seats. McDonnell drew up plans to equip production models with more modern Pratt & Whitney JT12 or General Electric CF700 engines, and the 220 was awarded a Federal Aviation Administration (FAA) type certificate on 17 October 1960.

The company made a provisional deal with Pan American World Airways to lease 170 of the jets, but no other orders materialized, and McDonnell was ultimately unable to offer the aircraft to Pan Am at an attractive price; consequently, the airline rejected the aircraft in favor of the Dassault-Breguet Mystère 20, and no further production ensued. The McDonnell Corporation subsequently used the prototype as a VIP transport before selling it in March 1965 to the Flight Safety Foundation, which used it for crash survival tests and other research in Phoenix, Arizona. The jet was subsequently rumored to have been used for covert missions in Latin America before winding up derelict in Albuquerque.

As of 2019, the single prototype was still extant, registered as N4AZ and stored at El Paso International Airport. FAA records show that in January of 2022, the aircraft was sold.

Specifications (McDonnell 220)

See also

References

Notes

Citations

Bibliography

 Yenne, Bill (1988). McDonnell Douglas. Crescent.

External links

 Model 119/220 (McDonnell 1959) Boeing site
 Pilot News, April 1982
 Video original McDonnell 220 Marketing Promo Video

1950s United States civil utility aircraft
Abandoned civil aircraft projects of the United States
119
Quadjets
Low-wing aircraft
Aircraft first flown in 1959
1950s United States business aircraft